Royal Air Force Castle Archdale or more simply RAF Castle Archdale, also known for a while as RAF Lough Erne is a former  Royal Air Force station used by the RAF and the Royal Canadian Air Force station in County Fermanagh, Northern Ireland.

History

RAF Castle Archdale was located on the eastern shore of Lower Lough Erne, near the village of Lisnarrick. It was used during the Second World War by flying boats of No. 209 Squadron RAF. From Castle Archdale, Consolidated Catalinas and Short Sunderlands could patrol the North Atlantic for German U-boats. A secret agreement with the government of Ireland allowed aircraft to fly from Lough Erne to the Atlantic along the Donegal Corridor.

In May 1941 the German battleship Bismarck was found during a routine patrol by a Catalina flying out of Castle Archdale boat base on Lower Lough Erne, Northern Ireland.

RAF St Angelo and RAF Killadeas were also on the shores of Lough Erne, close by.

Units
The following units were here at some point:
No. 119 Squadron RAF between 16 April 1942 and 6 September with the Catalina IIIA
No. 201 Squadron RAF initially between 9 October 1941 and 8 April 1944 with the Sunderland I, II & III then again between 3 November 1944 and 2 August 1945 with the Sunderland III & V
No. 202 Squadron RAF between 3 September 1944 and 4 June 1944 when it was disbanded using Catalina IB & IV
No. 228 Squadron RAF between 11 December 1942 and 4 May 1943 using Sunderland I, II & III
No. 230 Squadron RAF between 10 August 1946 and 16 September 1946 using Sunderland V
No. 240 Squadron RAF as a detachment between July 1940 and 28 March 1941 using Stranraer and Catalina I
No. 422 Squadron RCAF was formed here on 2 April 1942 with the Lerwick I and Catalina IB staying until 30 October 1942. The squadron returned between 13 April 1944 and 4 November 1944 with the Sunderland III
No. 423 Squadron RCAF between 2 November 1942 and 8 August 1945 using the Sunderland II & III
No. 302 Ferry Training Unit RAF (September - December 1942)
No. 2707 Squadron RAF Regiment

Postwar

A flag lowering ceremony was conducted in late 1957, and the airfield finally closed on 31 January 1958.

Today the base is part of Castle Archdale Country Park. The slipway remains in use and the concrete stands for parking the Catalina aircraft are now part of a caravan site. Other buildings lie derelict and overgrown in the surrounding forest. A museum in the park grounds has a section devoted to its role during the Second World War.

See also

List of former Royal Air Force stations
Castle Archdale estate history.

References

Citations

Bibliography

External links

Castle Archdale in Coastal Command

Royal Air Force stations in Northern Ireland
World War II sites in Northern Ireland
Royal Air Force stations of World War II in the United Kingdom
Military history of County Fermanagh
Buildings and structures in County Fermanagh
Defunct airports in Northern Ireland
1940 establishments in Northern Ireland
1945 disestablishments in Northern Ireland